Keven Stammen (born November 15, 1985) is an American poker player living in Celina, Ohio.  He was winner of a No Limit Texas hold 'em event of the 2009 World Series of Poker.

Stammen has played poker professionally since he was 18.  His total live tournament winnings exceed $4,250,000. Stammen plays on Full Tilt Poker and Pokerstars as Stammdogg and stamdogg3 on Absolute Poker.  Stammen ranked #5 in 2008 on Officialpokerrankings.com for Pokerstars.  Stammen also won the World Poker Tour World Championship in Season XII.

Stammen won $506,786 in his World Series of Poker victory.

References

External links
Bluff Magazine interview

1985 births
Living people
People from Celina, Ohio
American poker players
World Series of Poker bracelet winners
World Poker Tour winners